Kylie Halliday (born c. 1981) is one of Australia’s and the world’s top sports aerobics athletes. Ranked number 1 in South Australia for 5 years from 2000 to 2004, she was Australian ranked number 1 in 2003 and 2004 and world ranked number 2 in 2004.

Kylie's home town of Adelaide, South Australia hosted the FISAF World Championships in 2004 where Kylie placed 2nd to Finland's Tiia Piili.

In December 2009 Kylie ranked world number one at the FISAF World Championships in Martinique (FISAF).

References

1981 births
Living people
Australian aerobic gymnasts
Female aerobic gymnasts
Sportswomen from South Australia
Sportspeople from Adelaide